The 1995–1996 Colorado Avalanche season was the first season of the Nordiques/Avalanche franchise after moving from Quebec City to Denver.  As a result, the Avalanche were assigned to the Pacific Division of the NHL's Western Conference. The Avalanche finished the regular season as division champions and second overall in the conference, and advanced to the Stanley Cup  finals for the first time in team history against the Florida Panthers, which they defeated in a sweep to get the franchise's first NHL title.

Regular season

The Avalanche played their first game in the McNichols Sports Arena in Denver on October 6, 1995, winning 3–2 against the Detroit Red Wings. Led by captain Joe Sakic, forward Peter Forsberg and defenseman Adam Foote on the ice, Pierre Lacroix as the general manager, and Marc Crawford as the head coach, the Avalanche got stronger when former Montreal Canadiens goalie Patrick Roy joined the team. Feeling humiliated for being left in the net after having conceded 9 goals on 26 shots during a Canadiens game against the Red Wings, Roy joined the Avalanche on December 6, 1995, together with ex-Montreal captain Mike Keane in a trade for Jocelyn Thibault, Martin Rucinsky and Andrei Kovalenko. Roy would prove a pivotal addition for Colorado in the years to come.

On January 3, 1996, the Avalanche lost at home, 1–0, to the New Jersey Devils. It was the first time in 123 consecutive regular-season games that the team was shut out; the last time the team had been shut out was while they were the Quebec Nordiques. That game took place on January 27, 1994, and the Nordiques lost on the road, 3–0, to the Pittsburgh Penguins.

The Avalanche finished the regular season with a 47–25–10 record for 104 points, won the Pacific Division and finished second in the Western Conference. They scored 326 goals: an average of nearly 4 per game. Despite allowing the most short-handed goals in the league, with 22, they also scored the most short-handed goals, with 21. Four Avalanche players scored at least 30 goals.

December 11, 1995: Patrick Roy earned his first victory in net as a member of the Colorado Avalanche. It was a 5-1 victory over the Toronto Maple Leafs.
February 5, 1996: Patrick Roy played the Canadiens for the first time since he was traded to the Colorado Avalanche. Roy stopped 37 of 39 shots in a 4-2 win. After the game, Roy took the game puck and flipped it to Canadiens head coach Mario Tremblay.

Season standings

Schedule and results

|- align="center" bgcolor="#bbffbb" 
| 1 || October 6 || Detroit || 2 – 3 || Colorado || || Fiset || 1–0–0 || 2 
|- align="center" bgcolor="#ffbbbb" 
| 2 || October 7 || Colorado || 2 – 4 || Los Angeles || || Fiset || 1–1–0 || 2 
|- align="center" 
| 3 || October 9 || Pittsburgh || 6 – 6 || Colorado || OT || Fiset || 1–1–1 || 3 
|- align="center" bgcolor="#bbffbb" 
| 4 || October 11 || Boston || 1 – 3 || Colorado || || Fiset || 2–1–1 || 5 
|- align="center"  bgcolor="#ffbbbb"
| 5 || October 13 || Colorado || 1 – 3 || Washington || || Fiset || 2–2–1 || 5 
|- align="center" bgcolor="#ffbbbb"
| 6 || October 14 || Colorado || 1 – 4 || St. Louis || || Thibault || 2–3–1 || 5 
|- align="center" bgcolor="#bbffbb" 
| 7 || October 18 || Washington || 2 – 4 || Colorado || || Fiset || 3–3–1 || 7 
|- align="center" bgcolor="#bbffbb" 
| 8 || October 23 || Anaheim || 1 – 3 || Colorado || || Fiset || 4–3–1 || 9 
|- align="center" bgcolor="#bbffbb" 
| 9 || October 25 || Colorado || 3 – 2 || Calgary || || Fiset || 5–3–1 || 11 
|- align="center" bgcolor="#bbffbb" 
| 10 || October 27 || Buffalo || 4 – 5 || Colorado || || Fiset || 6–3–1 || 13 
|- align="center" bgcolor="#bbffbb" 
| 11 || October 30 || Colorado || 6 – 1 || Dallas || || Thibault || 7–3–1 || 15 
|-

|- align="center" bgcolor="#bbffbb" 
| 12 || November 1 || Calgary || 1 – 6 || Colorado || || Thibault || 8–3–1 || 17 
|- align="center" bgcolor="#bbffbb"
| 13 || November 3 || Colorado || 5 – 2 || Winnipeg || || Fiset || 9–3–1 || 19 
|- align="center" bgcolor="#bbffbb"
| 14 || November 5 || Colorado  || 7 – 3 || Chicago || || Fiset || 10–3–1 || 21 
|- align="center" 
| 15 || November 9 || Dallas || 1 – 1 || Colorado || OT || Thibault || 10–3–2 || 22 
|- align="center"  bgcolor="#bbffbb"
| 16 || November 11 || Colorado || 8 – 4 || Vancouver || || Fiset || 11–3–2 || 24 
|- align="center" bgcolor="#ffbbbb"
| 17 || November 15 || Colorado || 3 – 7 || Anaheim || || Thibault || 11–4–2 || 24 
|- align="center" bgcolor="#bbffbb" 
| 18 || November 17 || Colorado || 5 – 3 || Calgary || || Fiset || 12–4–2 || 26 
|- align="center" bgcolor="#bbffbb" 
| 19 || November 18 || Calgary || 2 – 5 || Colorado || || Fiset || 13–4–2 || 28 
|- align="center" 
| 20 || November 20 || Colorado || 3 – 3 || Edmonton || OT || Fiset || 13–4–3 || 29 
|- align="center" bgcolor="#bbffbb" 
| 21 || November 22 || Chicago || 2 – 6 || Colorado || || Fiset || 14–4–3 || 31 
|- align="center" 
| 22 || November 25 || Colorado || 2 – 2 || Montreal || OT || Thibault || 14–4–4 || 32 
|- align="center" bgcolor="#bbffbb" 
| 23 || November 28 || Colorado || 7 – 3 || NY Islanders || || Thibault || 15–4–4 || 34 
|- align="center" bgcolor="#ffbbbb"
| 24 || November 29 || Colorado || 3 – 4 || New Jersey || OT || Thibault || 15–5–4 || 34 
|-

|- align="center" bgcolor="#ffbbbb"
| 25 || December 1 || Colorado || 3 – 5 || NY Rangers || || Thibault || 15–6–4 || 34 
|- align="center" bgcolor="#ffbbbb"
| 26 || December 3 || Dallas || 7 – 6 || Colorado || || Fiset || 15–7–4 || 34 
|- align="center" bgcolor="#bbffbb"
| 27 || December 5 || San Jose || 2 – 12 || Colorado || || Fiset || 16–7–4 || 36 
|- align="center"  bgcolor="#ffbbbb"
| 28 || December 7 || Edmonton || 5 – 3 || Colorado || || Roy || 16–8–4 || 36 
|- align="center"  bgcolor="#bbffbb"
| 29 || December 9 || Colorado || 7 – 3 || Ottawa || || Fiset || 17–8–4 || 38 
|- align="center" bgcolor="#bbffbb"
| 30 || December 11 || Colorado || 5 – 1 || Toronto || || Roy || 18–8–4 || 40 
|- align="center" bgcolor="#ffbbbb"
| 31 || December 13 || Colorado || 3 – 4 || Buffalo || || Roy || 18–9–4 || 40 
|- align="center" bgcolor="#ffbbbb"
| 32 || December 15 || Colorado || 2 – 4 || Hartford || || Fiset || 18–10–4 || 40 
|- align="center"  bgcolor="#ffbbbb"
| 33 || December 18 || Vancouver || 4 – 2 || Colorado || || Roy || 18–11–4 || 40 
|- align="center" bgcolor="#bbffbb" 
| 34 || December 20 || Colorado || 4 – 1 || Edmonton || || Roy || 19–11–4 || 42 
|- align="center" bgcolor="#bbffbb" 
| 35 || December 22 || St. Louis || 1 – 2 || Colorado || || Roy || 20–11–4 || 44 
|- align="center"
| 36 || December 23 || Colorado || 2 – 2 || Los Angeles || OT || Fiset || 20–11–5 || 45 
|- align="center" bgcolor="#bbffbb"
| 37 || December 26 || Colorado || 5 – 1 || San Jose || || Roy || 21–11–5 || 47 
|- align="center" bgcolor="#bbffbb"
| 38 || December 29 || Toronto || 2 – 3 || Colorado || || Roy || 22–11–5 || 49 
|-

|- align="center" bgcolor="#ffbbbb"
| 39 || January 3 || New Jersey || 1 – 0 || Colorado || || Roy || 22–12–5 || 49 
|- align="center"
| 40 || January 4 || Philadelphia || 2 – 2 || Colorado || OT || Fiset || 22–12–6 || 50 
|- align="center" bgcolor="#ffbbbb"
| 41 || January 6 || Colorado || 2 – 5 || Toronto || || Roy || 22–13–6 || 50 
|- align="center"  bgcolor="#bbffbb"
| 42 || January 9 || Colorado || 3 – 0 || Boston || || Fiset || 23–13–6 || 52 
|- align="center"
| 43 || January 10 || Florida || 4 – 4 || Colorado || OT || Roy || 23–13–7 || 53 
|- align="center"
| 44 || January 14 || Calgary || 4 – 4 || Colorado || OT || Fiset || 23–13–8 || 54 
|- align="center" bgcolor="#bbffbb"
| 45 || January 16 || Colorado || 5 – 2 || Pittsburgh || || Roy || 24–13–8 || 56 
|- align="center" bgcolor="#ffbbbb"
| 46 || January 17 || Colorado || 2 – 3 || Detroit || || Roy || 24–14–8 || 56 
|- align="center"  bgcolor="#bbffbb"
| 47 || January 22 || NY Islanders || 3 – 4 || Colorado || || Roy || 25–14–8 || 58 
|- align="center" 
| 48 || January 25 || Vancouver|| 2 – 2 || Colorado || OT || Fiset || 25–14–9 || 59 
|- align="center" bgcolor="#bbffbb" 
| 49 || January 27 || Colorado || 4 – 3 || San Jose || OT || Roy || 26–14–9 || 61 
|- align="center" bgcolor="#ffbbbb"
| 50 || January 31 || Colorado || 1 – 2 || Anaheim || || Roy || 26–15–9 || 61 
|-

|- align="center" bgcolor="#bbffbb"
| 51 || February 1 || Winnipeg || 4 – 6 || Colorado || || Fiset || 27–15–9 || 63 
|- align="center" bgcolor="#bbffbb"
| 52 || February 3 || NY Rangers || 1 – 7 || Colorado || || Roy || 28–15–9 || 65 
|- align="center" bgcolor="#bbffbb"
| 53 || February 5 || Montreal || 2 – 4 || Colorado || || Roy || 29–15–9 || 67 
|- align="center" 
| 54 || February 7 || Tampa Bay || 4 – 4 || Colorado || OT || Fiset || 29–15–10 || 68 
|- align="center" bgcolor="#ffbbbb"
| 55 || February 9 || Hartford || 3 – 2 || Colorado || OT || Roy || 29–16–10 || 68 
|- align="center" bgcolor="#bbffbb"
| 56 || February 11 || Colorado || 5 – 3 || Philadelphia || || Fiset || 30–16–10 || 70 
|- align="center" bgcolor="#ffbbbb"
| 57 || February 15 || Colorado || 2 – 4 || Tampa Bay || || Roy || 30–17–10 || 70 
|- align="center" bgcolor="#bbffbb"
| 58 || February 16 || Colorado || 5 – 4 || Florida || OT || Fiset || 31–17–10 || 72 
|- align="center"  bgcolor="#bbffbb"
| 59 || February 19 || Edmonton || 5 – 7 || Colorado || || Roy || 32–17–10 || 74 
|- align="center" bgcolor="#bbffbb"
| 60 || February 23 || Los Angeles|| 2 – 6 || Colorado || || Fiset || 33–17–10 || 76 
|- align="center" bgcolor="#bbffbb" 
| 61 || February 25 || Ottawa || 2 – 4 || Colorado || || Roy || 34–17–10 || 78 
|- align="center" bgcolor="#bbffbb"
| 62 || February 26 || Anaheim || 2 – 3 || Colorado || || Roy || 35–17–10 || 80
|- align="center" bgcolor="#ffbbbb"
| 63 || February 29 || Colorado || 3 – 4 || Chicago || || Roy || 35–18–10 || 80 
|-

|- align="center" bgcolor="#bbffbb"
| 64 || March 1 || Chicago || 3 – 5 || Colorado || || Roy || 36–18–10 || 82 
|- align="center" bgcolor="#bbffbb"
| 65 || March 3 || Toronto || 0 – 4 || Colorado || || Roy || 37–18–10 || 84 
|- align="center" bgcolor="#ffbbbb"
| 66 || March 5 || San Jose || 5 – 3 || Colorado || || Fiset || 37–19–10 || 84 
|- align="center" bgcolor="#ffbbbb"
| 67 || March 8 || Detroit || 4 – 2 || Colorado || || Roy || 37–20–10 || 84 
|- align="center" bgcolor="#bbffbb"
| 68 || March 9 || Colorado || 7 – 5 || Vancouver || || Fiset || 38–20–10 || 86 
|- align="center" bgcolor="#ffbbbb"
| 69 || March 13 || Colorado || 0 – 4 || Anaheim || || Roy || 38–21–10 || 86 
|- align="center" bgcolor="#bbffbb"
| 70 || March 17 || Edmonton || 1 – 8 || Colorado  || || Roy || 39–21–10 || 88 
|- align="center" bgcolor="#bbffbb"
| 71 || March 19 || Colorado || 4 – 3 || Vancouver || || Roy || 40–21–10 || 90 
|- align="center"  bgcolor="#bbffbb"
| 72 || March 20 || Colorado || 5 – 2 || Los Angeles || || Fiset || 41–21–10 || 92 
|- align="center" bgcolor="#ffbbbb"
| 73 || March 22 || Colorado|| 0 – 7 || Detroit || || Roy || 41–22–10 || 92 
|- align="center" bgcolor="#bbffbb" 
| 74 || March 24 || Colorado || 5 – 2 || Winnipeg || || Roy || 42–22–10 || 94 
|- align="center" bgcolor="#ffbbbb"
| 75 || March 27 || Winnipeg || 3 – 1 || Colorado || || Fiset || 42–23–10 || 94
|- align="center" bgcolor="#bbffbb"
| 76 || March 28 || Colorado || 8 – 3 || San Jose || || Roy || 43–23–10 || 96 
|-

|- align="center" bgcolor="#ffbbbb"
| 77 || April 3 || St. Louis || 6 – 3 || Colorado || || Roy || 43–24–10 || 96 
|- align="center" bgcolor="#bbffbb"
| 78 || April 6 || San Jose || 1 – 5 || Colorado || || Roy || 44–24–10 || 98 
|- align="center" bgcolor="#bbffbb"
| 79 || April 7 || Colorado || 4 – 1 || Dallas || || Roy || 45–24–10 || 100 
|- align="center" bgcolor="#bbffbb"
| 80 || April 10 || Anaheim || 3 – 7 || Colorado || || Roy || 46–24–10 || 102 
|- align="center" bgcolor="#bbffbb"
| 81 || April 11 || Colorado || 3 – 2 || St. Louis || || Fiset || 47–24–10 || 104 
|- align="center" bgcolor="#ffbbbb"
| 82 || April 14 || Los Angeles || 5 – 4 || Colorado || OT || Roy || 47–25–10 || 104
|-

Playoffs

Colorado progressed to the playoffs and won the series against the Vancouver Canucks, the Chicago Blackhawks and Presidents' Trophy winners Detroit Red Wings. In the Stanley Cup Final, the Avalanche met the Florida Panthers, who were also in their first Stanley Cup final. The Avalanche swept the series 4–0. In Game Four, during the third overtime and after more than 100 minutes of play with no goals, defenseman Uwe Krupp scored to claim the franchise's first Cup. Joe Sakic was the playoff's scoring leader with 34 points (18 goals and 16 assists) and won the Conn Smythe Trophy, awarded to the most valuable player to his team during the playoffs. The 1996 Stanley Cup was the first major professional championship won by a Denver team. With the Stanley Cup win, Russians Alexei Gusarov and Valeri Kamensky and Swede Peter Forsberg became members of the "Triple Gold Club", the exclusive group of ice hockey players who have won Olympic gold, World Championship gold and the Stanley Cup.

|- align="center" bgcolor="#bbffbb"
| 1 || April 16 || Vancouver || 2 – 5 || Colorado || || 16,061 || Roy || 1 – 0
|- align="center" bgcolor="#ffbbbb"
| 2 || April 18 || Vancouver || 5 – 4 || Colorado || || 16,061 || Roy || 1 – 1
|- align="center" bgcolor="#bbffbb"    
| 3 || April 20 || Colorado || 4 – 0 || Vancouver || || 18,422 || Roy || 2 – 1
|- align="center" bgcolor="#ffbbbb"
| 4 || April 22 || Colorado || 3 – 4 || Vancouver || || 18,422 || Roy || 2 – 2
|- align="center" bgcolor="#bbffbb"
| 5 || April 25 || Vancouver || 4 – 5 || Colorado || OT || 16,061 || Roy || 3 – 2
|- align="center" bgcolor="#bbffbb"
| 6 || April 27 || Colorado || 3 – 2 || Vancouver || || 18,422 || Roy || 4 – 2
|- align="center"

|- align="center" bgcolor="#ffbbbb"
| 1 || May 2 || Chicago || 3 – 2 || Colorado || OT || 16,061 || Roy || 0 – 1
|- align="center" bgcolor="#bbffbb"
| 2 || May 4 || Chicago || 1 – 5 || Colorado || || 16,061 || Roy || 1 – 1
|- align="center" bgcolor="#ffbbbb"    
| 3 || May 6 || Colorado || 3 – 4 || Chicago || OT || 20,797 || Roy || 1 – 2
|- align="center" bgcolor="#bbffbb"
| 4 || May 8 || Colorado || 3 – 2 || Chicago || 3OT || 22,454 || Roy || 2 – 2
|- align="center" bgcolor="#bbffbb"
| 5 || May 11 || Chicago || 1 – 4 || Colorado || || 16,061 || Roy || 3 – 2
|- align="center" bgcolor="#bbffbb"
| 6 || May 13 || Colorado || 4 – 3 || Chicago || 2OT || 21,356 || Roy || 4 – 2
|- align="center"

|- align="center" bgcolor="#bbffbb"
| 1 || May 19 || Colorado || 3 – 2 || Detroit || OT || 19,957 || Roy || 1 – 0
|- align="center" bgcolor="#bbffbb"
| 2 || May 21 || Colorado || 3 – 0 || Detroit || || 19,983 || Roy || 2 – 0
|- align="center" bgcolor="#ffbbbb"    
| 3 || May 23 || Detroit || 6 – 4 || Colorado || || 16,061 || Roy || 2 – 1
|- align="center" bgcolor="#bbffbb"
| 4 || May 25 || Detroit || 2 – 4 || Colorado || || 16,061 || Roy || 3 – 1
|- align="center" bgcolor="#ffbbbb"
| 5 || May 27 || Colorado || 2 – 5 || Detroit || || 19,983 || Roy || 3 – 2
|- align="center" bgcolor="#bbffbb"
| 6 || May 29 || Detroit || 1 – 4 || Colorado || || 16,061 || Roy || 4 – 2
|- align="center"

|- align="center" bgcolor="#bbffbb"
| 1 || June 4 || Florida || 1 – 3 || Colorado || || 16,061 || Roy || 1 – 0
|- align="center" bgcolor="#bbffbb"
| 2 || June 6 || Florida || 1 – 8 || Colorado || || 16,061 || Roy || 2 – 0
|- align="center" bgcolor="#bbffbb"    
| 3 || June 8 || Colorado || 3 – 2 || Florida || || 14,703 || Roy || 3 – 0
|- align="center" bgcolor="#bbffbb"
| 4 || June 10 || Colorado || 1 – 0 || Florida || 3OT || 14,703 || Roy || 4 – 0
|-

Player statistics

Skaters

Goaltending

† Denotes player spent time with another team before joining the Avalanche. Stats reflect time with the Avalanche only.
‡ Denotes player was traded mid-season. Stats reflect time with the Avalanche only.

Note: GP = Games played; G = Goals; A = Assists; Pts = Points; +/- = Plus/minus; PIM = Penalty minutes;
      GS = Games started; TOI = Time on ice; W = Wins; L = Losses; T = Ties; GA = Goals-against; GAA = Goals-against average; SO = Shutouts; SA = Shots against; SV% = Save percentage;

Awards and records

Team trophies
Stanley Cup
Clarence S. Campbell Bowl

Player awards and trophies
Conn Smythe Trophy: Joe Sakic

1996 NHL All-Star Game

Colorado Avalanche NHL All-Star representatives in the 1996 NHL All-Star Game at the FleetCenter in Boston.

 Joe Sakic, C, (Western Conference All-Stars)
 Peter Forsberg, C, (Western Conference All-Stars)
 Marc Crawford, Assistant Coach, (Western Conference All-Stars)

Transactions

Trades

Other transactions

Draft picks
Colorado's picks at the 1995 NHL Entry Draft in Edmonton, Alberta, Canada.

Notes
 The Avalanche acquired this pick as the result of a trade on February 20, 1994 that sent John Tanner to Anaheim in exchange for this pick.
 The Avalanche acquired this pick as the result of a trade on July 7, 1995 that sent David Ling and a ninth-round pick in 1995 (233rd overall) to Calgary in exchange for this pick.
 The Avalanche fourth-round pick went to the Ottawa Senators as the result of a trade on April 7, 1995 that sent Bill Huard to Quebec in exchange for the rights to Mika Stromberg and this pick (103rd overall).
 The Avalanche ninth-round pick went to the Calgary Flames as the result of a trade on July 7, 1995 that sent a ninth-round pick in 1995 (228rd overall) to Quebec in exchange for David Ling and this pick (233rd overall).

See also
1995–96 NHL season

References

General

The Internet Hockey Database
Colorado Avalanche Database
Official National Hockey League Site

Footnotes

1995–96 NHL season by team
1995–96 in American ice hockey by team
1995-96
1995-1996
1995
1996 Stanley Cup
Colorado
Colorado